Maria Yegorovna Gaidar (1990–2004 Smirnova; born 21 October 1982) is a Russian and Ukrainian state and public figure and politician.

She has been Deputy of the Odessa regional council since 30 May 2015, and external adviser to the President of Ukraine since 28 March 2017 to 17 May 2019.

In the past, Advisor to the Chairman of the Odessa regional state administration in social protection and health (2015–2016), then the Deputy head of administration of Odessa region on social issues (January–May 2016). The founder of the Fund of social support of population, "Social demand" on 16 July 2015a – head of the Fund,. The Deputy Prime Minister of the Kirov region of Russia (2009—2011).

Personal life
Maria Gaidar was born in Moscow to a prominent political and literary Russian family. She is the daughter of former Russian Prime Minister, Yegor Gaidar. On her paternal side, she is a granddaughter of Soviet admiral Timur Gaidar, daughter of Leah Lazarevna Solomyanskaya and a great-granddaughter of famous Soviet writers Arkady Gaidar and Pavel Bazhov. Through Arkady Gaidar, she is a descendant of Russian aristocratic Salkova family. Through the Salkova family, she is a descendant of Mikhail Lermontov. She is step-daughter of the daughter of writer Arkady Strugatsky. Maria's parents divorced in 1985, three years after she was born. Gaidar stayed with her mother, Irina Smirnova. In 1991 the family moved to Cochabamba, Bolivia, where they lived for five years. In 1996 she returned to Moscow.

In 2000 she entered and in 2005 graduated summa cum laude from the Academy of National Economy under the Government of the Russian Federation.

Gaidar is fluent in English, German, Spanish and her native Russian. In 2011, she was admitted to Harvard University for a Mid-Career Masters in Public Administration, where she studied for 8 months. In 2014 she graduated from Kutafin Moscow State Law University.

Career

In Russia

Gaidar was one of the leaders of The Other Russia organization and Union of Right Forces party. She has been a fierce critic of Putin's government and has been briefly detained for involvement in dissenters' marches and for placing a propaganda poster under a bridge using mountaineering gear. During the 2008 Russian presidential election, Gaidar produced numerous video materials in which Vladimir Putin was depicted as the anti-Christ leading the world to a nuclear apocalypse.

In February 2009, Gaidar became an advisor to the new governor of Kirov Oblast, Nikita Belykh, and on 23 July she was confirmed as a deputy governor in Kirov Oblast. In June 2011, Gaidar announced that she would resign as adviser due to her admission to Harvard University. In December 2012, she became an adviser to Moscow Vice-Major for Social Problems . In November 2013, she left the Government of Moscow to work for the charity Sotsialny Zapros (social query) created by her. In 2015, she threatened to renounce her Russian citizenship, planning to become an Israeli citizen under the Law of Return and to move to Israel. However, she subsequently said that she wished to retain her Russian citizenship, and to keep three citizenships – Russian, Ukrainian and Israeli.

In Ukraine
On 17 July 2015, Gaidar accepted an offer from Mikheil Saakashvili and became a vice-governor of Odessa Oblast in Ukraine. Her practical work has been as a fixer combating fraud and ensuring that vital social functions run smoothly. She received Ukrainian citizenship on 4 August 2015. This she described in September 2015 as "It didn't feel good at all....But for me to be here, now, and to be here completely, it's important." A few days after her appointment Gaidar stated she wants to retain her Russian citizenship, adding "In the future I hope that Russia will be a democratic country and it will be possible to go back and work there." Ukrainian law prohibits dual citizenship and only Ukrainian citizens can serve as appointed public officials. Gaidar has indicated she would be willing to serve on Saakashvili's team as an adviser or volunteer (functions open to foreigners).

Various Russian public figures criticized Gaidar's decision: Russian politician Vitaly Milonov requested an investigation of Maria Gaidar for high treason, the leader of the Liberal Democratic Party of Russia, Vladimir Zhirinovsky, proposed forbidding Gaidar from returning to Russia, while Russia's Commissioner for Human Rights Ella Pamfilova announced that the Russian government would freeze grants to Gaidar's charity Sotsialny Zapros. Sotsialny Zapros itself stated that Gaidar had already stepped down as the organization's head the previous week and that the NGO had voluntarily and formally already refused all government grants.

In the October 2015 Odessa regional election Gaidar was elected into the Odessa Oblast parliament for Petro Poroshenko Bloc. Gaidar resigned as deputy governor after a new law barring a regional lawmaker being simultaneously a civil servant took effect on 1 May 2016. Gaidar resigned her seat in Odessa Oblast's legislature on 10 June 2018, the  assembly unannounced on June 12 that it had relieved Gaidar of her duties as a lawmaker at her request.

On 5 April 2017 Gaidar was appointed an adviser of Ukrainian President Petro Poroshenko.

References

External links
Russians Must Shed Fear (Her interview), Demokratizatsiya, 2007 by Arias-King

1982 births
Living people
Politicians from Moscow
Union of Right Forces politicians
Echo of Moscow radio presenters
Russian political activists
Russian women in politics
Russian dissidents
Harvard Kennedy School alumni
21st-century Ukrainian politicians
21st-century Ukrainian women politicians
Russian emigrants to Ukraine
Naturalized citizens of Ukraine
Local politicians in Ukraine
Petro Poroshenko Bloc politicians
Kutafin Moscow State Law University alumni
Russian Presidential Academy of National Economy and Public Administration alumni
21st-century Russian women politicians